Lake Sakakawea State Park is a public recreation area occupying  on the southern shore of Lake Sakakawea in Mercer County, North Dakota.

History
The park was originally developed by the U.S. Army Corps of Engineers as Garrison Lake State Park. The North Dakota Parks and Recreation Department assumed management in 1965, then expanded the park, renaming it Lake Sakakawea State Park in 1973.

Activities and amenities
The park offers hiking, swimming, fishing, boat ramps, marina, cabins, and campgrounds. The park's hiking trails include the western terminus of the  North Country National Scenic Trail which, when completed, will cross the northern tier of the continental United States from its eastern terminus at Crown Point in upstate New York.

References

External links
Lake Sakakawea State Park North Dakota Parks and Recreation Department 
Lake Sakakawea State Park Map North Dakota Parks and Recreation

State parks of North Dakota
Protected areas established in 1965
1965 establishments in North Dakota
Protected areas of Mercer County, North Dakota